The Institute of Physical Chemistry of the Polish Academy of Sciences (Polish Instytut Chemii Fizycznej Polskiej Akademii Nauk) is one of numerous institutes belonging to the Polish Academy of Sciences. As its name suggests, the institute's primary research interests are in the field of physical chemistry. The institute is subdivided into departments, including the Department of Soft Condensed Matter and Fluids, the Department of Physical Chemistry of Supramolecular Complexes, the Department of Photochemistry and Spectroscopy and the Department of Quantum Theory of Solids and Molecules, this is also known as the PIPC.

External links
 Institute of Physical Chemistry website 

Institutes of the Polish Academy of Sciences
Chemistry organizations